

Heinrich Hogrebe (22 June 1913 – 25 June 1998) was a German forester who was a recipient of Order of Merit of the Federal Republic of Germany to honor his forestry researches and the creation of the Arboretum Burgholz. During World War II, he served as an officer in the Wehrmacht of Nazi Germany and was a recipient of the Knight's Cross of the Iron Cross with Oak Leaves.

Awards and decorations
 Iron Cross (1939) 2nd Class (25 June 1941) & 1st Class (22 August 1941)
 German Cross in Gold on 14 April 1942 as Leutnant of the Reserves in the 1./Infanterie-Regiment 422
 Knight's Cross of the Iron Cross with Oak Leaves
 Knight's Cross on 17 August 1942 as Oberleutnant of the Reserves and chief of the 5./Infanterie-Regiment 422
 Oak Leaves on 13 April 1944 as Hauptmann and commander of II./Grenadier-Regiment 422
 Order of Merit of the Federal Republic of Germany (1977)

References

Citations

Bibliography

 
 

1913 births
1998 deaths
People from the Province of Westphalia
Recipients of the Gold German Cross
Recipients of the Knight's Cross of the Iron Cross with Oak Leaves
Recipients of the Cross of the Order of Merit of the Federal Republic of Germany
German foresters
German Army officers of World War II
Military personnel from Bochum